Pavlovsk is the name of several inhabited localities in Russia.

Urban localities
Pavlovsk, Saint Petersburg, a town in Pushkinsky District of the federal city of Saint Petersburg
Pavlovsk, Voronezh Oblast, a town in Pavlovsky District of Voronezh Oblast

Rural localities
Pavlovsk, Altai Krai, a selo in Pavlovsky Selsoviet of Pavlovsky District of Altai Krai
Pavlovsk, Arkhangelsk Oblast, a selo in Pavlovsky Selsoviet of Vilegodsky District of Arkhangelsk Oblast
Pavlovsk, Sakha Republic, a selo in Neryuktyayinsky Rural Okrug of Megino-Kangalassky District of the Sakha Republic
Pavlovsk, Zabaykalsky Krai, a selo in Gazimuro-Zavodsky District of Zabaykalsky Krai

See also
Pavlovsk (disambiguation)
Pavel
Pavlov (disambiguation)
Pavlovka (disambiguation)
Pavlovsky (disambiguation)
Pavlovo
Novopavlovsk
Petropavlovsk (disambiguation)

References